Tammy Hurt (born 1965) is an American drummer, producer, and music advocate. Hurt's music project, Sonic Rebel, was featured as the cover story for the June 2021 print and digital edition of Atlanta's Creative Loafing. She is also known for her work with the Recording Academy.

Early life and music career
She attended Joseph Wheeler High School in Marietta, Georgia and played drums in every type of band – marching band, concert band, symphonic band, jazz band and many garage bands. In 1987, Hurt graduated from the Presbyterian College with a B.A. in Business Administration. Hurt began playing drums professionally at age 14. Among her credits, she has recorded and performed live with the GRAMMY-winning group Indigo Girls, GRAMMY-winning producer Brendan O'Brien and GRAMMY-winning producer Nick DiDia. Her past musical projects include Paper Dolls, She Said, Minority Rules, Superchick and Duvasounds. Hurt has also recorded with Indigo Girls, Wendy Bucklew and Angela Motter.

In July 2020, Hurt launched Sonic Rebel Music, by debuting the release of “Run,” the first track from the five-song debut EP, “We Made This With Our Hands.” "Run" debuted exclusively on Twitch during a special Fortnite in-game activation. She worked with Dan Gleason and Ben Homola of Grouplove, recording engineer TJ Elias and multi-instrumentalist Kevin Spencer. Hurt and Elias launched Sonic Rebel when he was programming for electronic music duo Thievery Corporation.

Business career
Hurt is the managing partner of Placement Music, a boutique entertainment firm specializing in custom music, scoring and licensing for all media platforms. Placement Music highlights include being commissioned by FOX Sports for a second consecutive Super Bowl broadcast to create original full orchestral score. Her additional credits include Paramount Pictures, CBS, MTV, HBO, BET, Sony, Lifetime, Hallmark, NFL, NASCAR, “True Blood,” “Dexter,” “Drop Dead Diva,” “Mean Girls 2”, and multiple custom placements in the indie film “HITS” which debuted at the Sundance Film Festival. Hurt is a recipient of Catalyst Magazine’s Top 25 Entrepreneurs and Ones to Watch Award, and a 5-year co-chair of the Recording Academy’s national membership committee which, in partnership with national staff, developed the criteria and goals for the new membership process.

Recording Academy
Hurt served on the local Board of the Recording Academy’s Atlanta Chapter for 14 years. On June 3, 2021, The Recording Academy elected Hurt as the Chair of the National Board of Trustees. She is the first openly LGBTQ+ Officer of the Academy.

Georgia Music Investment Act
A co-founder of the nonprofit organization, Georgia Music Partners (GMP), Hurt spearheaded the campaign to create and pass Georgia’s first standalone music tax incentive, the Georgia Music Investment Act. It was a seven-year effort. She is currently leading an initiative with stakeholders from the City of Atlanta, Fulton County, the State of Georgia and the Grammy Museum Foundation, to meaningfully bring the Grammy brand to Atlanta. These efforts have resulted in a $500K local capital raise to kick off the first phase of due diligence for the project.

Selected discography
 Paper Dolls, Paper Dolls (1987) - drums, percussion
 Wendy Bucklew, Painting Sidewalks (1993) - drums
 Indigo Girls, "Forever Dusty" (2000) - drums, percussion
 Angela Motter, Outta Control (2005) - drums
 Steve Dancz, Declaration Anthem (2011) - producer
 Heart of Independence (2014) - producer
Sonic Rebel, "Run" (2020) - drums, producer, artist
Sonic Rebel, "Reign" (2020) - drums, producer, artist
Sonic Rebel, "This Vibe" (2021) - drums, producer, artist

References

1965 births
Living people
American music industry executives
American women record producers
Presbyterian College alumni